Loren Walter Houston (born October 26, 1932) is a former American football guard in the National Football League for the Washington Redskins. He graduated from Massillon Washington High School after twice being on Ohio-state championship teams. His senior-year team in 1950, quarterbacked by classmate Don James, was rated the no. 1 high school team in the United States. Houston went on to play college football at University of Miami and Purdue University and was drafted in 26th round of the 1955 NFL Draft.

References

1932 births
Living people
American football offensive guards
People from Union County, Illinois
Players of American football from Illinois
Purdue Boilermakers football players
Washington Redskins players